Barantsev (masculine) or Barantseva (feminine) is a Russian surname. Notable people with the surname include:
Alexei Barantsev (born 1959), Russian businessman
Daniil Barantsev (born 1982), Russian ice dancer.
Denis Barantsev (born 1992), Russian ice hockey player

Russian-language surnames